Vashafaru (Dhivehi: ވަށަފަރު) is one of the inhabited islands of  Haa Alif Atoll and is geographically part of Thiladhummathi Atoll in the north of the Maldives. It is an island-level administrative constituency governed by the Vashafaru Island Council. 

The island is famous for its long white sand spit- the Vashafaru-thundi. People of Vashafaru are skilled carpenters and boat-builders known throughout the Maldives.Vashafaru, surrounded by a beautiful lagoon and long stretches of white sandy beach, is the only island in the Maldives famous for its turtle seen. Have you ever seen turtles crawling on white sandy beaches and swim happily in the crystal clear lagoons? If you want to experience this luxurious nature with low budget, its time to choose Vashafaru  which is located on the beach in this beautiful unique island in Maldives. All we can say is tourists love the island for a reason. It is also very famous for its long white sand spit- the Vashafaru-thundi. People of Vashafaru are skilled carpenters and boat-builders known throughout the Maldives.

Geography

Demography

References

External links
Isles: Vashafaru

Islands of the Maldives